Thomas Christopher Drougas, Jr. (born December 25, 1949) is a former American football player who played offensive tackle in the National Football League in the 1970s.

He played high school football at Sunset High School in Beaverton, Oregon and played offensive lineman for the University of Oregon, becoming a first-team All-America selection in 1971, as the leading blocker for the Ducks’ high-powered offense that featured the likes of quarterback Dan Fouts, receiver Bob Newland, and running back Bobby Moore (Ahmad Rashad). He was drafted by the Baltimore Colts with their first pick in the 1972 NFL Draft. He later played for the Denver Broncos, the Kansas City Chiefs, and the Miami Dolphins before retiring in 1976.

References

1949 births
Living people
American football offensive tackles
Oregon Ducks football players
Baltimore Colts players
Denver Broncos players
Kansas City Chiefs players
Miami Dolphins players
Players of American football from Portland, Oregon
Sunset High School (Beaverton, Oregon) alumni